Infinity Fluids, founded in 1998, is a Massachusetts corporation which develops process and thermal systems for the fuel cell, pharmaceutical, industrial, and biotechnology industries.

It was founded in Norwich, CT and is a manufacturing and research organization specializing in the fields of Fluid Heating, Steam Reforming and Instant Steam Generation.

Products
Some of the work performed by Infinity includes:

DI and gaseous thermal systems for the NASA space program.
Instant steam generators for the pharmaceutical industry, particularly sterilization.
Increasing efficiency of steam reform systems for fuel cells.
Marked reduction in size and mass of OEM equipment manufacturing.

Patents
Infinity Fluids holds the patent to:
 Compact Resistive Element System (CRES)
 Electric co-axial heater
 In Line Instant Steam Generator
 Central Axis flow through thermal fluid system

External links
 Infinity Fluids Corporate Website

Companies based in Massachusetts